John Spiers (born 1975) is an English melodeon, concertina and bandoneon player. He is widely recognised as one of the leading English melodeon players of his generation.

Career

Spiers is best known for his work with Jon Boden in the duo Spiers and Boden and the band Bellowhead. He also played with Eliza Carthy's former band The Ratcatchers in the mid-noughties. Since Bellowhead called it a day in 2016, Spiers has released two highly acclaimed albums with Peter Knight, Well Met (2018)  and Both in a Tune (2021), which has been described as 'An extraordinary collaboration between two musicians at the absolute top of their game'; he also plays regularly with Peter Knight's Gigspanner Big Band, whose 2020 album Natural Invention has been described as 'a piece of music that feels thrillingly, frighteningly, beautifully of our time... some of the most important and exhilarating art ever to sit under the banner of folk music'. Spiers also performs regularly in a duo with Jackie Oates, mostly but not just at Nettlebed Folk Club; Oates and Spiers released a joint album in 2020 called Needle Pin, Needle Pin.

Compositions
Several of Spiers' compositions have become English folk session classics, most notably the jig Jiggery Pokerwork (a homage to his first melodeon), and a tune encapsulating his views of the Conservative Party. The former piece is well-known among melodeon players for its notoriously unplayable B-section, particularly the infamous "Bb of doom".

Personal life
Spiers was born in Birmingham but moved to Abingdon at an early age. His father is a Morris dancer. He attended John Mason School in Abingdon, and then went on to study genetics at King's College, Cambridge.  As a child he learned the organ and piano and when he was a university student he began to play the piano accordion and melodeon. After spending some time busking he started a new career selling melodeons, of which he owns several.

He and his partner have two sons.

Other publications
The John Spiers Tunebook (2002) – 32 tunes with chords
  
 59 original tunes with chords
  
 a collection of 94 popular session tunes with chords

References

External links
 
Spiers and Boden official site
Bellowhead official site

1975 births
People from Birmingham, West Midlands
English folk musicians
Living people
Date of birth missing (living people)
English melodeon players
21st-century accordionists
Bellowhead members